Balmerino is a small village and former monastic centre in Fife, Scotland. It is the home of Balmerino Abbey and the former abbots of Balmerino who were great regional landlords. It became a secular lordship in 1605 when the abbey's lands were transferred into a Barony and the title of Lord Balmerino was created. The already fire-damaged abbey was allowed to fall into ruin as it no longer had a function. The Abbey ruins and grounds are managed by the National Trust for Scotland and are famed for the ancient sweet chestnut tree and the display of aconites which flower in February.

The village contains a number of 18th and 19th century houses in a local vernacular and is now an official Conservation Area.

The name Balmerino derives from Scottish Gaelic. The first element, bal-, is from baile, meaning a farmstead, or in modern Gaelic, a town. The second element is more obscure. It may refer to Saint Merinach or it may derive from muranach meaning 'of sea-grass', yielding: "[the] farm where sea-bent or sea-grass grows."

Balmerino Parish Church lies 1 km outside the village and dates from 1811. The manse was added in 1816. Originally a simple Georgian box chapel the church was remodelled in the Gothic style in 1883. The church hall was added in 1887.

Balmerino is "celebrated" in the poem "Beautiful Balmerino" by William McGonagall – widely recognised to be the English language's worst poet.

See also
List of places in Fife

External links

 Balmerino on geo.ed.ac.uk
 Balmerino - History of the Parish
 Fife Place-name Data :: Balmerino

References 

Villages in Fife
Parishes in Fife